Nya Dagbladet is a Swedish online daily newspaper founded in 2012, which has a historical connection to the National Democrats, a far-right political party in Sweden. It publishes articles promoting conspiracy theories about the Holocaust, COVID-19 vaccines, climate change, mobile phone towers, and others. Other common themes include immigration, GMOs, Israel, the EU, and pro-Kremlin propaganda regarding the Russian invasion of Ukraine. Markus Andersson is its editor-in-chief.

References 

Swedish news websites
Conspiracist media